The Cree are a Native American ethnic group.

Cree may also refer to:

Business
 CREE, flight ID of Air Creebec, a regional airline based in Val-d'Or, Quebec, Canada
 Wolfspeed, a North Carolina-based electronics manufacturer formerly known as Cree Inc.

Language
 Cree language, a language spoken in Canada
 Cree syllabics, are used to write Cree

People
 Cree Summer (born 1969), actress from Canada
 Cree (surname), a surname in English-speaking countries

Places
 Cree, County Clare, a village in Ireland
 Cree Lake, Canada
 Cree Lake (Crystal Lodge) Airport, a Canadian airport
 River Cree, a river in Scotland

See also
 CREES, a Peruvian non profit and business collaboration
 
 
 Kree (disambiguation)

English unisex given names